The Falmouth Commodores are a collegiate summer baseball team based in Falmouth, Massachusetts. The team is a member of the Cape Cod Baseball League (CCBL) and plays in the league's West Division. The Commodores play their home games at Arnie Allen Diamond at Guv Fuller Field in Falmouth.

The Commodores most recently won the CCBL championship in 1980 when they defeated the Chatham A's in the championship series. The title was the team's sixth overall in the league's modern era, having won four consecutive league titles from 1968 to 1971. The team has been led since 1999 by field manager Jeff Trundy.

History

Pre-modern era

Origins of baseball in Falmouth

Baseball has been played in Falmouth since the pre-Civil War days. The Barnstable Patriot reported on July 7, 1857 that, "the Fourth was celebrated at Falmouth by a game of base ball, in which some of the principal men of that place participated." In the late 19th and early 20th centuries, teams representing various Cape Cod towns routinely competed against one another. One particularly strong team was the Falmouth Heights Cottage Club team, whose name derived from the Falmouth Heights cottages where the players resided. Falmouth home games from the turn of the century through the early 1960s were played just steps from water's edge at the Central Park Field in Falmouth Heights. Spectators enjoyed an ocean view and a cool breeze as they took in the action at what was widely regarded as one of the most picturesque baseball settings in the nation.

During this era, attempts were made periodically to formalize league play among Cape Cod ballclubs. One such foray came in 1913 when Cottage Club manager H. Newton Marshall led the formation of a "Cape Cod Base Ball League". The league comprised six teams: Osterville, Pocasset, Orleans, Sandwich, South Yarmouth, and the Falmouth Heights Cottage Club, with each team playing each other team twice for a ten-game schedule. In what appears to have been the league's lone season, the Cottage Club claimed the pennant with a 9–1 record. Marshall was credited with "[turning] a rough field into one of the finest diamonds used for amateur base ball in this part of the country; ...equal in every respect to many of the major league diamonds," and with "[arousing] enthusiasm in base ball in Falmouth to such a pitch that people come from quite a distance to swell the crowds at the games." The team's popularity was such that Marshall, team captain Ralph Mendall, and the other Cottage Club players were celebrated in song at local theatrical performances.

Marshall managed the team through 1916, and his teams featured several past and future major leaguers. Fletcher Low of Dartmouth College played for the Cottage Club in 1914 and then played briefly for the Boston Braves the following season. Former New York Highlanders hurler Ray Tift pitched for the Cottage Club late in 1914, after defeating Falmouth earlier in the season as a member of the West Somerville, Massachusetts town team. Horace "Hod" Ford played shortstop for Falmouth in 1915 and 1916, and went on to play 15 years in the major leagues. Falmouth pitcher Walt Whittaker hurled a no-hitter against Oak Bluffs in 1915, and then played briefly for Connie Mack's Philadelphia Athletics in 1916.

Available players and funding were at a premium as the U.S. became involved in World War I, but Falmouth was able to field a team in 1917 under manager Earl White, a season highlighted by a split doubleheader against the powerful visiting Crescent Athletic Club of Brooklyn, New York. In the 1918 and 1919 seasons, Falmouth combined players and resources with the Oak Bluffs town team in response to the war shortage. The 1918 team was managed by Lewis Whiting, and featured Dave Morey, who had played for the Philadelphia Athletics in 1913. Morey took over as player-manager of the combined team in 1919, and continued in that position for the Falmouth team in 1920 and 1921.

Morey's 1919 Falmouth-Oak Bluffs club featured Somerville, Massachusetts native Pie Traynor, a shortstop who batted .322 on the season. Prior to the Labor Day game at Falmouth Heights against a visiting Fall River club, Traynor displayed his all-around athleticism by winning a "circling the bases" competition in 15 seconds, as well as winning the sprinting and baseball throwing competitions. Traynor went on to play in the major leagues for seventeen seasons with the Pittsburgh Pirates, winning the World Series with Pittsburgh in 1925, and compiling a lifetime .320 batting average. Considered one of the greatest third basemen in major league history, Traynor was inducted into the National Baseball Hall of Fame in Cooperstown, New York in 1948, the first former Cape Leaguer to be so honored. In 2009 Traynor was inducted into the CCBL Hall of Fame.

The early Cape League era (1923–1939)

In 1923 the Cape Cod Baseball League was formed and included four teams: Falmouth, Chatham, Osterville, and Hyannis. This early Cape League operated through the 1939 season and disbanded in 1940, due in large part to the difficulty of securing ongoing funding during the Great Depression. Although the composition of the league changed from year to year as various teams joined or dropped out, Falmouth's entry alone lasted the entire span of the league's history.

During the 1920s, several future major leaguers played for Falmouth. Brown University pitcher Hal Neubauer pitched for Falmouth in 1923, and played for the Boston Red Sox two years later. His battery-mate at Falmouth was catcher Bill Cronin, who hit a whopping .420 in 1923. Cronin went on to play several seasons for the major league Boston Braves. Falmouth took the pennant in the league's inaugural 1923 season, posting a record of 9–3, while Chatham, Osterville and Hyannis finished in a three-way tie for second place with identical 5–7 records.

CCBL Hall of Famer Danny "Deacon" MacFayden, a Cape Cod native from Truro, played for Falmouth in 1925. The season was highlighted by MacFayden's one-hitter against Hyannis. By 1926, he was playing for the hometown Boston Red Sox and went on to pitch for 17 years in the major leagues, winning a World Series title with the New York Yankees in 1932. Haskell "Josh" Billings played for Falmouth from 1925 to 1927, was team MVP in 1925, and finished the 1927 season playing for the Detroit Tigers. National Football League running back Curly Oden spent his off-season as Falmouth's player-manager in 1927 and 1928. Oden was known as "the king of the base stealers in the league," having "thrilled the crowds on several occasions by stealing home." CCBL all-league catcher Gene Connell played for Falmouth from 1927 to 1929, and went on to play for the Philadelphia Phillies. Future major league umpire Bill Stewart pitched for Falmouth in 1929. Prior to joining Falmouth in 1929, shortstop Waddy MacPhee had played briefly for the New York Giants.

On August 26, 1929 the Falmouth team travelled to Rockland, Massachusetts to play a charity exhibition contest against the major league Boston Braves. Before a crowd of about four thousand, the big-leaguers won the game, 8–7, but the game was tight and Falmouth "not only outhit the major aggregation 13–11, but outplayed them in many departments of the game." The Braves featured Baseball Hall of Fame first baseman George Sisler, who went 0-for-3 in the game. Falmouth went on finish the 1929 season two games ahead of Chatham-Harwich to win the pennant and claim the Cape League championship. The exhibition contest with the Braves became an annual event into the mid-1930s, with Falmouth defeating the major leaguers on multiple occasions. Baseball Hall of Famer Rabbit Maranville played for the Braves in the 1931 Falmouth game. Falmouth also played exhibitions against well-known barnstorming teams such as the House of David, whom Falmouth defeated in a 1929 contest, the Lizzie Murphy All-Stars, who played Falmouth to a 2–2 tie in 1930, and the Philadelphia Giants, who defeated Falmouth in 1930 behind the celebrated battery of Will "Cannonball" Jackman and Burlin White.

In 1930, Holy Cross catcher Jack Walsh joined Falmouth and batted .360 for the season. From 1931 to 1935, Walsh was Falmouth's player-manager, and also managed the team in 1936. He led the league in batting in 1933 with a .362 average, and skippered the team to league championships in 1931, 1932 and 1935. Walsh posted a 170–109 won-loss record as manager and did not have a losing season. He was inducted into the CCBL Hall of Fame in 2007. One of Walsh's charges at Falmouth was pitcher Al Blanche, a Somerville, Massachusetts native who was part of Falmouth's 1931 title team and went on to play for the Boston Braves. Another member of the 1931 team was third baseman Al Niemiec of Holy Cross. Niemiec went on to play for the Boston Red Sox, and in 1937 was traded by the Red Sox with one other player to San Diego of the Pacific Coast League in exchange for a promising young "kid" named Ted Williams. 1933 Falmouth hurler Emil "Bud" Roy began the summer with Barnstable, finished it with Falmouth, and was playing with the Philadelphia Athletics in September.

Walsh's 1935 Falmouth title team starred Bill "Lefty" Lefebvre, who went on to play for the Boston Red Sox and Washington Senators, and also featured pitcher Jud McLaughlin, who had played for the major league Red Sox a few years earlier. Due to a split regular season, the 1935 CCBL championship was decided by a best-of-five playoff between Falmouth and Barnstable. Falmouth sent Lefebvre to the mound in Game 1 at Hallet's Field, and took an 8–3 victory over Barnstable's ace Ted Olson in a pitching duel between future teammates for the 1938 Boston Red Sox. In Game 2 at home, Falmouth scratched out two runs in the bottom of the ninth to win, 3–2, and take a commanding series lead. Games 3 and 4 were played as a doubleheader, and Barnstable came out on top in both halves of the twinbill, 9–1 and 11–5, to even up the series. In Game 3 at Central Park Field, Barnstable slugger Jake Edwards hit a ball that crashed through the third-story window of a house just beyond the park's cozy right field, a blast that many Falmouth fans estimated was the longest seen at the field. The decisive Game 5 finale at Falmouth Heights was a rematch of moundsmen Lefebvre and Olson. With both hurlers pitching effectively, the game was tied, 2–2, with two out in the bottom of the ninth. Falmouth walked it off and took the title in exciting fashion when Jerry Shanahan scored on a hard line drive by Myron Ruckstull that resulted in an error off the usually reliable infielding glove of Barnstable's 18-year-old future major leaguer and CCBL Hall of Famer Lennie Merullo.

Joe Mulligan and Red Flaherty played for Falmouth in 1936. Mulligan had pitched for the Boston Red Sox in 1934, and Flaherty went on to enjoy a long major league umpiring career, officiating for over 20 years in the American League, including four World Series assignments. Falmouth's 1938 championship team featured burly slugger John Spirida, who went on to play pro football with the Washington Redskins the following year. The pitching star of the 1938 title team was former longtime major league hurler Rosy Ryan, who played in three World Series, and struck out the mighty Babe Ruth with the bases loaded in the 1923 World Series.

In 1939, the final year of the early Cape League, night baseball was introduced for the first time. Portable lights were staged at the Falmouth Heights field and used for a game against Barnstable. The following night, the lights were transported to Hyannis for the second game of the home-and-home series between the two clubs. Falmouth went on to win its second consecutive league championship in 1939, led by Danvers, Massachusetts native Connie Creeden, who went on to play for the Boston Braves.

The Upper and Lower Cape League era (1946–1962)

The Cape League was revived after World War II and was originally composed of 11 teams across Upper Cape and Lower Cape divisions. Falmouth's entry in the Upper Cape Division was known as the Falmouth All-Stars, as the players were a collection of stars from Falmouth's in-town "twilight league".

Led by manager John DeMello, the All-Stars won the inaugural championship of the new Cape League in 1946. The team featured CCBL Hall of Famers Roche Pires and Manny Pena, both of whom became regular fixtures for the All-Stars during this period. Falmouth defeated Sagamore in a one-game playoff for the Upper Cape Division title, then met Lower Cape champion Harwich in the best-of-three championship series. Harwich took Game 1 at Brooks Park, 6–1, holding the All-Stars to just three hits. Game 2 was played on Labor Day at Falmouth Heights before a reported crowd of 3,000. Pires struck out seven, and was "seldom in trouble," as Falmouth capitalized on four Harwich errors to build an 8–0 lead before Harwich finally got on the board with a pair of homers in the seventh. The Harwichers rallied again in each of the final two frames, but Pires held them off and went the distance in a 10–6 win that knotted the series at one game apiece. After Game 2, a coin flip determined Falmouth would host Game 3 the following weekend, and the All-Stars sent Pires to the mound in the finale. The game was even at 3–3 through five frames, but again Harwich's errors were its downfall, leading to Falmouth rallies in the late innings that gave the All-Stars the 8–4 victory and the league crown. Falmouth's championship club was celebrated as playing a "forcing, aggressive type of ball" that "compared favorably with the old semi-pro teams" of Falmouth's pre-war era. Pires and Pena led Falmouth back to the championship series in 1949, but the club was downed by Lower Cape champ Orleans.

In 1951, Falmouth entered a second franchise in the Cape League. Described as "young and spirited," the Falmouth Falcons were composed mainly of players in their late teens and early twenties. The team played for three years in the Cape League, sharing the Falmouth Heights field with the All-Stars. The 1951 Falcons were skippered by player/manager Charlie "Wig" Robb, and after opening their inaugural campaign in respectable fashion by finishing the season's first half in second place in the Upper Cape Division, the team's outlook seemed promising. Falcons' hurler Charlie Eastman was the winning pitcher for the Upper Cape in its 5–3 victory over the Lower Cape in the 1951 CCBL All-Star Game, and was joined on the Upper Cape squad by fellow Falcons Joe Parent at shortstop and Robb at third base. Falmouth native Charlie Borden, who had spent time as a minor leaguer in the Chicago Cubs farm system, took over managerial duties and pitched for the Falcons in 1952. Eastman, Robb and Parent were all-stars again in 1952, along with Borden and catcher Jack Cavanaugh. After disappointing seasons by both Falmouth teams in 1952, a merger for the following season was discussed, but the Falcons were not keen to the idea. Town funds were appropriated for only one team in 1953, but the Falcons remained in the league through independent financial support, led by new skipper Phil White. The season was the final one for the Falcons, as the teams were finally merged for the 1954 season.

Fall River, Massachusetts native and future Boston Red Sox catcher Russ Gibson had just joined Falmouth in 1957 when he was signed by Boston. In his only game with Falmouth, he hit two home runs.

Modern era (1963–present)

The 1960s: A new league, a new park, a new name

In 1963, the CCBL was reorganized and became officially sanctioned by the NCAA. The league would no longer be characterized by "town teams" who fielded mainly Cape Cod residents, but would now be a formal collegiate league. Teams began to recruit college players and coaches from an increasingly wide geographic radius.

The league was originally composed of ten teams, which were divided into Upper Cape and Lower Cape divisions. Falmouth joined Wareham, Cotuit, Bourne and Sagamore in the Upper Cape Division. In 1964 the Falmouth All-Stars moved from the Falmouth Heights field and began playing home games at Guv Fuller Field. The following year, the team's name was changed to the Falmouth Commodores.

Falmouth was the dominant team in the Cape League from the mid-1960s through the early 1970s. Led by CCBL Hall of Fame manager Bill Livesey, Falmouth reached the Cape League championship series six consecutive times beginning in 1966, winning the title in five of six years, including four consecutive titles from 1968 to 1971.

Livesey's 1966 title team featured CCBL Hall of Fame pitcher Noel Kinski, a three-time all star who had played for Bourne and Sagamore in the previous two seasons. Kinski went 7–3 with a 3.15 ERA and was the Upper Cape Division's starting All-Star Game pitcher for Falmouth in 1966. The club also featured another Sagamore castoff in University of Connecticut slugger Ron Bugbee, who had won the CCBL MVP award with Sagamore in 1965. After finishing the regular season atop the Upper Cape division, the Commodores faced Lower Cape champ Chatham in the best-of-five 1966 title series. Falmouth dropped Game 1 at Veteran's Field, but rebounded in Game 2 at home behind a 1–0 complete game shutout by Kinski. Game 3 was a 7–3 win on the road for Falmouth, setting up a classic series clincher at Guv Fuller Field in Game 4. With the Commodores down, 4–3 in the seventh inning, Bugbee, who had so far gone hitless in the series, blasted a two-run homer to put Falmouth up, 5–4. Clinging to a one-run lead with no outs and a runner on first in the top of the ninth, Livesey called to the bullpen for Kinski. The ace lefty proceeded to pick off the runner, then struck out Chatham all-stars Steve Saradnik and George Greer to give the Commodores the championship. The two teams met again for the title in 1967, with Chatham coming out on top.

The 1968 Commodores championship team included Worcester, Massachusetts native Pat Bourque, who went on to win a World Series with the 1973 Oakland A's. The Commodores met Harwich in the best-of-five 1968 championship series, and dropped Game 1 at Whitehouse Field. Falmouth stormed back with a 6–1 win in Game 2 at home, powered by slugger Mike Finnell, who launched a two-run homer and scored four of the team's six runs. Finnell was at it again in Game 3 on the road, blasting another four-bagger as the Commodores took a two-games-to-one series lead. The exciting Game 4 finale at Guv Fuller Field found the score tied at 10–10 and the bases loaded for Falmouth in the bottom of the tenth. The Commodores walked off with the championship as Steve Greenberg, son of Baseball Hall of Famer Hank Greenberg, drew a base on balls off Harwich's CCBL Hall of Fame hurler Pete Ford to force in the series-winning run.

Ace pitcher and CCBL Hall of Famer Paul Mitchell starred for Falmouth from 1969 to 1971. He was named the league's Outstanding Pitcher in 1969 and 1970, and was the winning pitcher in the league all star game in 1970 and 1971. In three seasons, Mitchell won 25 games for the Commodores, posting a 1.53 ERA with 317 strikeouts and 28 complete games. In the 1969 title series against Chatham, Falmouth dropped Game 1 in Chatham, being no-hit into the sixth inning, and ending up with only two hits in Chatham's 4–0 victory. But the Commodores stormed back in Game 2 at Guv Fuller Field as Paul Mitchell was the hero on the mound and contributed a home run in a 9–4 victory that set up the decisive third game. Falmouth's Mickey Karkut twirled a complete game gem and the Commodores came out on top, 5–2, to secure their second consecutive league title.

Livesey's "four-peat" launches the 1970s

Returning to the championship series in 1970, the Commodores faced the Orleans Cardinals. Falmouth lefty Jim Jachym shut out the Cards in Game 1, 2–0. The Commodores sent ace Paul Mitchell to the mound with ideas of a sweep in Game 2 at Eldredge Park. Falmouth jumped out to an early 3–0 lead in the top of the first, but Orleans answered in the bottom half to go ahead 4–3. The Cardinals took a 7–5 lead into the top of the ninth, but the Commodores rallied to go ahead 8–7, and Mitchell nailed down the series-clinching victory by striking out the side in the bottom of the ninth.

The 1971 title series was a best-of-five series, and was a rematch of the prior year, with the Commodores facing Orleans. The Cardinals took the Game 1 pitcher's duel at Guv Fuller, 1–0, on a homer by Brad Linden. Game 2 in Orleans also ended with a 1–0 tally, but this time the Commodores were on top to tie the series. Falmouth sent Paul Mitchell to the hill for Game 3 at home, and the ace came through with a 3–1 victory behind a three-run dinger by Kevin Bryant. An ugly sixth-inning brawl involving players, umpires and fans marred Game 4 at Eldredge Park. Skipper Livesey was tossed in the eighth, and Orleans went on to win, 7–5, to tie the series at two games apiece. Like Games 1 and 2, Game 5 at Guv Fuller Field was a pitcher's duel that ended with just a single run being scored. Commodores hurler Bob Lukas was dominating, allowing just five hits while striking out 16. The decisive run came in the bottom of the seventh, as Dave Creighton walked and stole second, then scored the series-winning run on a Ray O'Brien single to left. The win gave Falmouth its fourth consecutive championship, and fifth in six years.

Falmouth's 1972 team featured CCBL batting champ Ed Orrizzi (.372) and future major leaguers Billy Almon and Mike Flanagan. Flanagan went 7–1 for the season with a 2.18 ERA while also belting seven home runs; he went on to win a World Series and Cy Young Award with the Baltimore Orioles, and was inducted into the CCBL Hall of Fame in 2000. Due to a scheduling conflict with the Atlantic Collegiate Baseball League, the 1972 CCBL All-Star Game was contested between the CCBL all-stars and the defending champion Falmouth team at Guv Fuller field. The game was won by Falmouth, 8–1, with the home team's Mike Flanagan getting the victory.

With Livesey's departure after the 1972 season, Falmouth struggled for most of the rest of the 1970s, reaching the league championship only once, losing to Cotuit in 1975. The '70s dropoff reached its low point in 1977 when the team was forced to withdraw from the league mid-season, "plagued by injuries and lack of employment for its players."
1979 provided a sign of good things to come when CCBL Hall of Famer Billy Best hit .398 for the Commodores, and set league records with a 32-game hitting streak and at least one base hit in 39 of his 41 games played.

The 1980s and a return to championship form

In 1980, the Commodores welcomed the new decade by returning to the league championship series. Led by manager Al Worthington, the 1980 team featured future major leaguers Sid Bream and Steve Lombardozzi. After disposing of Cotuit in the semi-finals, the Commodores met the first place Chatham Athletics in the best-of-five title series. Falmouth took the first two games, but dropped the next two, setting up the pivotal Game 5 in Chatham. In the finale, Falmouth took the lead early when Bruce Helser drove in Tom "Bat" Masterson in the second inning. The run was the only one the Commodores needed. Falmouth starter Mark Winters, a 6-foot-6 southpaw, took advantage of swirling Veteran's Field winds to keep Chatham hitters at bay, tossing a four-hit shutout en route to Falmouth's decisive 5–0 victory. The championship was Falmouth's sixth of the modern era, and 14th overall.

The 1980s saw two Falmouth players post batting averages that are among the highest in Cape League history. In 1981, CCBL Hall of Famer Sam Nattile batted .443 with 70 hits and eight home runs for the Commodores. Nattile also belted a game-tying home run at the league's all star game at Fenway Park, a game that ended in a 4–4 tie. Hometown star Bob Allietta took the reins as Commodores field manager in 1983. A graduate of Falmouth's Lawrence High School, Allietta had played for the Commodores in 1970 and had gone on to play in the major leagues for the California Angels in the mid-1970s. The 1984 Falmouth team was skippered by CCBL Hall of Fame manager Ed Lyons, and featured CCBL Hall of Famers Jim McCollom, who batted .413 and slugged a league-high 15 home runs, and Doug Fisher, a first baseman who tied the league's single-season RBI record with 54, and finished just behind McCollom with 14 homers.

The 1990s

The 1991 Falmouth team was led by skipper Dan O'Brien, a former Cape Leaguer with Chatham who had gone on to play for the St. Louis Cardinals. In 1992 and 1993, the Commodores were piloted by CCBL Hall of Famer Arthur "Ace" Adams, who had played for the team in the early 1970s and was a league all-star in 1973. A colorful character, Ace's Falmouth baseball roots ran deep: not only had his father also played in the Cape League, but his father first met Ace's mother at Falmouth Heights field.
 
CCBL Hall of Fame manager Harvey Shapiro took the Falmouth helm in 1994, and led the team through 1998. The 1994 Commodores team featured several outstanding players. CCBL Hall of Famer and future major league all-star Darin Erstad was the Cape League's MVP. Joining him were the league's Outstanding Pitcher and fellow CCBL Hall of Famer, Bob St. Pierre, as well as the league's Outstanding Relief Pitcher, Scott Winchester. Winchester set a league record with 13 saves, while St. Pierre went 9–1 with a 1.44 ERA and 72 strikeouts in 75 innings.

Falmouth reached the league championship only once in the 1990s, as the 1996 Commodores were carried by CCBL Hall of Fame pitcher Eric Milton's microscopic 0.21 ERA, but lost to Chatham in the title series. Milton's season was highlighted by his no-hitter against Orleans in which he came within one walk of a perfect game. The Commodores took home individual honors in 1997 as Jason Edgar was named MVP of the CCBL All-Star Game, and in 1999 when Doc Brooks became the first Commodore to win the CCBL All-Star Game Home Run Derby.

The 2000s
The Commodores reached the CCBL championship series twice in the 2000s, but were swept by Y-D in both 2004 and 2007. The 2004 Falmouth team featured CCBL Hall of Fame shortstop Cliff Pennington and future Boston Red Sox star Jacoby Ellsbury, and in both seasons the Commodores were led by the league's MVP. In 2004 the MVP was CCBL Hall of Famer Daniel Carte, and in 2007 it was fellow CCBL Hall of Famer Conor Gillaspie. Carte began the 2004 season in an 0-for-19 slump, but busted out of it with his first three hits, all home runs. He led the league with 11 homers and 38 RBI, and his .308 average left him just 19 points shy of the triple crown. Gillaspie finished the 2007 season tops in the league in batting with a .345 mark, and also led the league in slugging and extra-base hits.

2005 Commodore Tim Norton was co-recipient of the league's Outstanding Pitcher Award, posting a 5–1 record with a 1.77 ERA and 77 strikeouts against only 15 walks in 61 innings. The 2006 season featured a combined no-hitter tossed by Commodore hurlers Kris Dobrowiecki, Sean Morgan, Brandon Copp and Sam Demel against Bourne. Future major league all-star pitcher Aaron Crow was the CCBL's Outstanding Pro Prospect in 2007. In 2008, another future MLB all-star, A.J. Pollock, took home the league's MVP Award, batting .377 with 61 hits. Jimmy Cesario led the Cape League with a .387 batting average in 2008, and fellow-Commodore Todd Cunningham did the same in 2009 with his .378 mark on the way to being named the league's Outstanding Pro Prospect.
 
Longtime Commodore volunteer Arnie Allen received the league's inaugural Lifetime Achievement Award in 2002, and in 2004 the diamond at Guv Fuller Field was named Arnie Allen Diamond in his memory. Skipper Jeff Trundy surpassed Bill Livesey in 2007 as the longest-tenured manager in Falmouth history, a mark Trundy proceeded to leave far behind.

The 2010s

The Commodores qualified for postseason play in nine of ten years in the 2010s, and reached the CCBL championship three times. Falmouth was bounced from the championship series in 2011 by Harwich. In 2014 and 2016, the Commodores ran into old nemesis Y-D, who defeated Falmouth for a pair of titles as they had done the decade before. From 2016 to 2019, the Commodores finished the regular season atop the league's West Division three out of four years, but were bumped from the playoffs in each season.

North Dighton, Massachusetts native and Holy Cross hurler Nate Koneski was the league's Outstanding New England Player in 2011, posting a 1.03 ERA with 24 strikeouts in 26.1 innings. Falmouth's 2013 and 2014 teams starred CCBL Hall of Fame shortstop Kevin Newman, who led the league in batting both seasons, the first player in the league's modern era to win back-to-back batting titles. Newman hit .375 in his first season, then bettered his mark by 10 points the following season, and was named 2014 league MVP. The 2016 Commodores featured the league's Outstanding Pro Prospect, Michael Gigliotti, as well as the league's Outstanding Pitcher, Jeff Passantino. In 2019, Falmouth featured league Outstanding Relief Pitcher Zachary Brzykcy and league batting champ Zach DeLoach (.353).

The 2020s
The 2020 CCBL season was cancelled due to the coronavirus pandemic.

CCBL Hall of Fame inductees

The CCBL Hall of Fame and Museum is a history museum and hall of fame honoring past players, coaches, and others who have made outstanding contributions to the CCBL. Below are the inductees who spent all or part of their time in the Cape League with Falmouth.

Notable alumni

 David Aardsma 2002
 David Adams 2007
 Bob Allietta 1970
 Bill Almon 1972–1973
 Matt Antonelli 2004–2005
 Steve Balboni 1976
 Philip Barzilla 2000
 Chad Bettis 2008
 Haskell "Josh" Billings 1925–1927
 Jake Bird 2016
 Al Blanche 1931
 Brian Bocock 2005
 Brian Bogusevic 2004
 Alec Bohm 2017
 Pat Bourque 1968
 Kyle Bradish 2017
 Sid Bream 1980
 Will Brennan 2018
 John Briscoe 1987
 Rex Brothers 2008
 Cliff Brumbaugh 1994
 Dallas Buck 2004–2005
 Mitch Canham 2006
 Scott Carroll 2006
 Kevin Cash 1999
 Preston Claiborne 2007–2008
 Garrett Cleavinger 2013–2014
 Gene Connell 1927–1929
 P.J. Connelly 2004
 Connie Creeden 1939
 Kevin Cron 2013
 Bill Cronin 1923–1924
 Aaron Crow 2007
 Todd Cunningham 2009
 Logan Davidson 2017–2018
 Sam Demel 2005–2006
 Ross Detwiler 2006
 Carlos Diaz 1984
 Bill Doran 1977
 Kelly Dransfeldt 1995–1996
 Tyler Duffey 2011
 Steven Duggar 2014
 Jonathan Dziedzic 2012
 Dave Eiland 1986
 Seth Elledge 2016
 Jacoby Ellsbury 2004
 Kent Emanuel 2011
 Chris Enochs 1996
 Darin Erstad 1993–1994
 Luke Farrell 2012
 Durbin Feltman 2017
 Brandon Finnegan 2013
 Steve Fireovid 1977
 Jeff Fischer 1984
 Red Flaherty 1936
 Mike Flanagan 1972
 Marv Foley 1974
 Horace "Hod" Ford 1915–1916
 Tony Fossas 1978
 Christian Friedrich 2007
 Rich Gale 1974
 Ian Gardeck 2011
 Grayson Garvin 2009
 Chippy Gaw 1926
 Kyle Gibson 2007
 Russ Gibson 1957
 Casey Gillaspie 2013
 Conor Gillaspie 2007
 Brandon Gomes 2003, 2006
 Marco Gonzales 2012
 Tom Grant 1977
 Khalil Greene 1999–2000
 Cadyn Grenier 2016
 Lee Gronkiewicz 1999
 Matt Hague 2007
 Matt Hall 2014
 Caleb Hamilton 2015
 Mark Hamilton 2004–2005
 Kris Harvey 2004
 Andrew Heaney 2011
 Brian Herosian 1971–1972
 Aldro Hibbard 1911, 1913, 1915–1916
 Tyler Holton 2016
 Rhys Hoskins 2013
 Mike Huff 1984
 Chad Huffman 2005
 Logan Ice 2015
 Steven Jackson 2001–2002
 Bryce Johnson 2016
 Caleb Joseph 2007
 Nate Karns 2008
 Adam Kennedy 1996
 Spencer Kieboom 2011
 Mike Kinkade 1994
 Dennis Konuszewski 1991
 Eddie Kunz 2006
 B. J. LaMura 2000–2001
 Trevor Larnach 2016–2017
 Preston Larrison 2000
 Corey Lee 1995–1996
 Derek Lee 1986
 Wilfred "Lefty" Lefebvre 1935
 Ryan Lefebvre 1992
 Chris Leroux 2004
 Jensen Lewis 2003–2004
 Richie Lewis 1986
 Steve Lombardozzi 1978–1980
 Javier López 1997
 Mark Loretta 1991–1992
 Aaron Loup 2008
 Fletcher Low 1914
 Cory Luebke 2006
 Tyler Lumsden 2002
 Scott Lusader 1985
 Danny "Deacon" MacFayden 1925
 Waddy MacPhee 1929–1930
 Ever Magallanes 1986
 Val Majewski 2001
 Mike Maksudian 1987
 Nick Maronde 2010
 Corbin Martin 2016
 Richie Martin 2013
 Nick Martinez 2011
 Tino Martinez 1986
 Nick Martini 2010
 J. J. Matijevic 2015–2016
 Jud McLaughlin 1935
 John Means 2013
 Jim Mecir 1990
 Sam Militello 1989
 Justin Miller 2008
 Eric Milton 1995–1996
 Pat Misch 2001–2002
 Paul Mitchell 1969–1971
 Carmen Mlodzinski 2019
 Billy Mohl 2003
 Bryce Montes de Oca 2015
 Dave Morey 1918–1921
 Hunter Morris 2009
 Joe Mulligan 1936
 John Nelson 1998
 Matheu Nelson 2019
 Hal Neubauer 1923
 Kevin Newman 2013–2014
 Al Niemiec 1931
 Curly Oden 1926–1928
 Adam Oller 2015
 Jim Paciorek 1980
 Joe Paterson 2006
 Cliff Pennington 2004
 David Phelps 2007
 Jim Ploeger 2013
 A. J. Pollock 2008
 Jorge Reyes 2008
 Jim Riggleman 1973
 Cory Riordan 2006
 Harry J. Robertson 1914–1915
 Jim Robertson 1914–1915
 Steve Rosenberg 1985
 Emil "Bud" Roy 1933
 Darin Ruf 2008
 Scott Ruskin 1983
 Adley Rutschman 2017
 Rosy Ryan 1937–1938
 Cole Sands 2016–2017
 Gary Scott 1988
 Luke Scott 2000f
 Troy Scribner 2012
 Todd Sears 1996
 Rob Segedin 2008
 Jon Shave 1989
 T. J. Sikkema 2018
 Brady Singer 2016
 Vince Sinisi 2002
 Brett Sinkbeil 2005
 Matt Skole 2009–2010
 Evan Skoug 2015
 DeAndre Smelter 2011
 Scott Sobkowiak 1997
 Lary Sorensen 1975
 Vasili Spanos 2002
 John Spirida 1938
 Bill Stewart 1929
 Matt Stites 2010
 Kyle Stowers 2018
 Doug Strange 1984
 Scott Strickland 1996
 Spencer Strider 2018
 Andrew Susac 2010
 Kevin Tapani 1985
 Nick Tepesch 2008–2009
 Ray Tift 1914
 Ozzie Timmons 1990
 Chris Tracz 2002–2003
 Pie Traynor 1919
 Mike Trombley 1988
 George Tsamis 1986–1988
 John Tudor 1975
 Cory Vance 1998–1999
 Brett Wallace 2006
 Matt Wallner 2018
 Allen Watson 1990
 Jeff Weaver 1997
 Kyle Weiland 2007
 Turk Wendell 1987
 Ben Wetzler 2012
 Ed Whited 1984
 Walt Whittaker 1914–1915
 Alex Wilson 2007–2008
 Kris Wilson 1995–1996
 Scott Winchester 1994
 Joey Wong 2007–2008
 Alex Young 2014

Yearly results

Results by season, 1923–1939

* During the CCBL's 1923–1939 era, postseason playoffs were a rarity. In most years, the regular season pennant winner was simply crowned as the league champion.However, there were four years in which the league split its regular season and crowned separate champions for the first (A) and second (B) halves. In two of thoseseasons (1936 and 1939), a single team won both halves and was declared overall champion. In the other two split seasons (1933 and 1935), a postseasonplayoff series was contested between the two half-season champions to determine the overall champion.

Results by season, 1946–1962

* Regular seasons split into first and second halves are designated as (A) and (B).

Results by season, 1963–present

League award winners

(*) - Indicates co-recipient

All-Star Game selections

(*) Due to a scheduling conflict with the ACBL, the 1972 All-Star Game was contested between the CCBL all-stars and the defending league champion Commodores team.

Italics - Indicates All-Star Game Home Run Hitting Contest participant (1988 to present)

No-hit games

Managerial history

(*) - Season count excludes 2020 CCBL season cancelled due to coronavirus pandemic.

See also
 Falmouth Commodores players

References

External links

Rosters

 2000
 2001
 2002
 2003
 2004
 2005
 2006
 2007
 2008
 2009
 2010
 2011
 2012
 2013
 2014
 2015
 2016
 2017
 2018
 2019
 2021
 2022

Other links
Falmouth Commodores official site
CCBL Home Page

Cape Cod Baseball League teams
Amateur baseball teams in Massachusetts
Falmouth, Massachusetts